Amblyseius excelsus is a species of mite in the family Phytoseiidae.

References

excelsus
Articles created by Qbugbot
Animals described in 1979